Gökhan Güleç (born 25 September 1985) is a Turkish footballer who currently plays for Şanlıurfaspor.

Career
Güleç was transferred to his previous club, Beşiktaş, on 17 January 2006 by French Manager Jean Tigana who was advised by Turkish National Team manager Fatih Terim. He has currently scored 10 goals in 20 Turkish Super Cup games. In November 2009 he opened the scoring in his team's shock 1–3 away win at Fenerbahce. In five games, he had scored six goals in the first half of the 2009 season, in all competitions.

In December 2012, Güleç agreed to join Azerbaijan Premier League side Khazar Lankaran He played a total of 13 games, scoring twice before being released at the end of the 2012–13 season. Güleç is of Albanian origin.

Honours

Club
Beşiktaş
Turkish Cup: 2005–06, 2006–07
Turkish Super Cup: 2006

References

External links
 

1985 births
Living people
People from İnegöl
Turkish footballers
Turkey under-21 international footballers
Turkey youth international footballers
İnegölspor footballers
Beşiktaş J.K. footballers
Kasımpaşa S.K. footballers
Denizlispor footballers
Gaziantepspor footballers
Bursaspor footballers
Şanlıurfaspor footballers
Süper Lig players
Khazar Lankaran FK players
Turkish expatriate footballers
Expatriate footballers in Azerbaijan
Association football forwards